The men's 10,000 m points race in inline speed skating at the 2001 World Games took place on 25 August 2001 at the Akita Prefectural Skating Rink in Akita, Japan.

Early life and career

Results

Preliminary

Heat A

Heat B

Final

References

External links
 Results on IWGA website

Inline speed skating at the 2001 World Games